Mikhail Ivanovich Kalinin (3 June 1946), was a Soviet politician and Russian Old Bolshevik revolutionary. He served as head of state of the Russian Soviet Federative Socialist Republic and later of the Soviet Union from 1919 to 1946. From 1926, he was a member of the Politburo of the Communist Party of the Soviet Union.

Born to a peasant family, Kalinin worked as a metal worker in Saint Petersburg and took part in the 1905 Russian Revolution as an early member of the Bolsheviks. During and after the October Revolution, he served as mayor of Petrograd (St. Petersburg). After the revolution, Kalinin became the head of the new Soviet state, as well as a member of the Central Committee of the Communist Party and the Politburo.

Kalinin remained the titular head of state of the Soviet Union after the rise of Joseph Stalin, with whom he enjoyed a privileged relationship, but held little real power or influence. He retired in 1946 and died in the same year. The former East Prussian city of Königsberg, annexed by the Soviet Union in 1945, was renamed Kaliningrad after him a year later. The city of Tver was also known as Kalinin until 1990 when its historic name was restored, one year before the fall of the Soviet Union.

Early life 
Mikhail Ivanovich Kalinin was born on 19 November 1875 to a peasant family of ethnic Russian origin in the village of Verkhnyaya Troitsa, Tver Governorate, Russia. He was the elder brother of Fedor Kalinin.

Kalinin finished his education at a local school in 1889 and worked for a time on a farm. He moved to Saint Petersburg, where he found employment as a metal worker in 1895. He also worked as a butler and then as a railway worker at Tbilisi depot, where he met Sergei Alliluyev, the father of Joseph Stalin's second wife.

In 1906, he married the ethnic Estonian Ekaterina Lorberg ( (1882–1960). She changed her last hame to Kalinina after the marriage.

Early political career 
	

Kalinin joined the Russian Social Democratic Labour Party (RSDLP) in 1898, the year of its foundation. He came to know Stalin through the Alliluyev family.

During the Russian Revolution of 1905, Kalinin worked for the RSDLP and on the staff of the Central Union of Metal Workers. He later became active on behalf of the RSDLP in Tiflis, Georgia (now Tbilisi); Reval, Estonia (now Tallinn); and Moscow. In April 1906 he served as a delegate at the 4th Congress of the Russian Social Democratic Labour Party.

Kalinin was an early and devoted adherent of the Bolshevik faction of the RSDLP, headed by Vladimir Lenin. He was a delegate to the 1912 Bolshevik Party Conference held in Prague, where he was elected an alternate member of the governing Central Committee and sent to work inside Russia. He did not become a full member because he was suspected of being an Okhrana agent (the real agent was Roman Malinovsky, a full member).

Kalinin was arrested for his subversive activities in 1916 during World War I and then freed during the February Revolution of 1917.

Russian Revolutions
Kalinin joined the Petrograd Bolshevik committee and assisted in the organization of the party daily newspaper Pravda, now legalized by the new regime.

In April 1917, Kalinin, like many other Bolsheviks, advocated conditional support for the Provisional Government in cooperation with the Menshevik faction of the RSDLP, a position at odds with that of Lenin. He continued to oppose an armed uprising to overthrow the government of Alexander Kerensky throughout that summer.

In the elections held for the Petrograd City Duma in autumn 1917, Kalinin was chosen as mayor of the city, which he administered during and after the Bolshevik Revolution of 7 November.

In 1919, Kalinin was elected a member of the governing Central Committee of the Russian Communist Party as well as a candidate member of the Politburo. He was promoted to full membership on the Politburo in January 1926, a position which he retained until his death in 1946.

When Yakov Sverdlov died in March 1919 from influenza, Kalinin replaced him as President of the All-Russian Central Executive Committee, the titular head of state of Soviet Russia. The name of this position was changed to Chairman of the Central Executive Committee of the USSR in 1922 and to Chairman of the Presidium of the Supreme Soviet in 1938. Kalinin continued to hold the post without interruption until his retirement at the end of World War II.

In 1920, Kalinin attended the Second World Congress of the Communist International in Moscow as part of the Russian delegation. He was seated on the presidium rostrum and took an active part in the debates.

Soviet Union 

Kalinin was a factional ally of Stalin during the bitter struggle for power after the death of Lenin in 1924. He delivered a report on Lenin and the Comintern to the Fifth World Congress in 1924.

Kalinin was one of the comparatively few members of Stalin's inner circle springing from peasant origins. The lowly social origins were widely publicised in the official press, which habitually referred to Kalinin as the "All-Union Elder" (Всесоюзный староста), a term harking back to the village community, in conjunction with his role as titular head of state. In practical terms, by the 1930s, Kalinin's role as a decision-maker in the Soviet government was nominal.

Although he was a member of the Politburo, the de facto executive branch of the Soviet Union, and nominally held the second-highest state post in the USSR, Kalinin held little power or influence. His role was mostly limited to receiving diplomatic letters from abroad. Recalling him, future Soviet leader Nikita Khrushchev said, "I don't know what practical work Kalinin carried out under Lenin. But under Stalin he was the nominal signatory of all decrees, while in reality he rarely took part in government business."

On 5 March 1940, six members of the Politburo—Stalin, Vyacheslav Molotov, Lazar Kaganovich, Kliment Voroshilov, Anastas Mikoyan, and Mikhail Kalinin—signed an order to execute 25,700 Polish "nationalists and counterrevolutionaries" (Polish intelligentsia, priests, and military officers) kept at camps and prisons in occupied western Ukraine and Belarus, as part of the Katyn massacre.

Kalinin was unable to protect his wife, Ekaterina Kalinina, who was critical of Stalin's policies and was arrested on 25 October 1938 on charges of being a "Trotskyist". At the time of her arrest Ekaterina and her husband Mikhail Kalinin were not living together. Although her husband was the chair of the Presidium of the Supreme Soviet (1938–46), she was tortured in Lefortovo Prison and on 22 April 1939, she was sentenced to fifteen years' imprisonment in a labour camp. She was released shortly before her husband's death in 1946.

Death and legacy 

Kalinin retired in 1946 and died of cancer on 3 June that year in Moscow. He was honoured with a state funeral and was buried in the Kremlin Wall Necropolis, in one of the twelve individual tombs located between the Lenin Mausoleum and the Kremlin Wall.

Three large Russian cities (Tver, Korolyov and Königsberg) were renamed after Kalinin. Tver's historic name was restored in 1990, while Kaliningrad was renamed into Korolyov in 1996 in honour of a famous Soviet/Russian rocket scientist Sergey Korolev.

Kalinin coal mine was excavated in 1961 and named after M. I. Kalinin.

Kalinin Square and Kalinin Street which were named after Kalinin are located in Minsk, Belarus. Prospekt Kalinina in Dnipro, Ukraine was renamed Prospekt Serhiy Nigoyan in January 2015 as part of decommunization in Ukraine.

See also
 Bibliography of Stalinism and the Soviet Union
 Stalin: Waiting for Hitler, 1929-1941, contains significant information about Kalinin

References

External links

Mikhail Kalinin Archive at marxists.org
Mikhail Kalinin by A. Dementyev and A. Pyanov, a 1975 English-language Soviet work in PDF format
 

1875 births
1946 deaths
People from Kashinsky District
People from Korchevskoy Uyezd
Russian Social Democratic Labour Party members
Old Bolsheviks
Politburo of the Central Committee of the Communist Party of the Soviet Union members
Members of the Orgburo of the Central Committee of the Communist Party of the Soviet Union
Stalinism
Anti-revisionists
Russian communists
Heads of state of the Russian Soviet Federative Socialist Republic
Heads of state of the Soviet Union
Russian Constituent Assembly members
First convocation members of the Soviet of Nationalities
Second convocation members of the Soviet of Nationalities
Atheists
Russian people of World War II
Soviet people of World War II
World War II political leaders
Heroes of Socialist Labour
Recipients of the Order of Lenin
Recipients of the Order of the Red Banner
Deaths from cancer in Russia
Burials at the Kremlin Wall Necropolis